This is a timeline documenting events of Jazz in the year 2018.

Events

January 
 11
 The 17th All Ears festival started in Oslo (January 11–14).
 The 4th annual Tucson Jazz Festival started in Tucson, Arizona (January 11 – 21).
 19 – The 37th annual Djangofestival started on Cosmopolite in Oslo, Norway (January 19–20).
 28 – The Gustav Lundgren Trio performed a tribute to Django Reinhardt at Stockholm Concert Hall.
 31
 The 7th Bodø Jazz Open started in Bodø, Norway (January 31 – February 3).
 The 13th Ice Music Festival started in Geilo, Norway (January 31 – February 4).

February 
 1 – The 20th Polarjazz Festival started in Longyearbyen, Svalbard (February 1 – 4).
 23 – Kirsti Huke received the 2017 Radka Toneff Memorial Award.
 25 – The band Hegge was awarded the 2017 jazz Spellemannprisen.

March 
 2 – The 14th Jakarta International Java Jazz Festival started in Jakarta, Indonesia (March 2 – 4).
 8 – The Turku Jazz Festival started in Åbo (March 8 – 11).
 16 – The Blue House Youth Jazz Festival started in Stockholm (March 16 – 18).
 23
 The 19th Cape Town International Jazz Festival started in Cape Town, South Africa (March 23 – 24).
 The 45th Vossajazz started in Voss, Norway (March 23 – 25). The opening was by Norwegian jazz poet Jan Erik Vold, warning about political misdirections of our time, followed by the opening concert signed Arild Andersen.

April 
 23 – The 7th Torino Jazz Festival started in Turin (April 23–30).
 25 – The 32nd April Jazz Espoo started (April 25 – 29).
 30 – The International Jazz Day.

May 
 4
 The Balejazz started in Balestrand (May 4 – 6).
 The 29th MaiJazz started in Stavanger, Norway (May 4 – 9).
 9 – The 14th AnJazz, the Hamar Jazz Festival started at Hamar, Norway (May 9 – 13).
 11 –  The 17th All Ears festival started in Oslo (January 11–14).
 24 – The 17th Festival Jazz à Saint-Germain-des-Prés started in Paris, France (May 24 – June 4).
 25 – The 46th Nattjazz started in Bergen, Norway (May 25 – June 2).

June
 12
 The Bergenfest started in Bergen (June 12 – 16).
 The Norwegian Wood music festival started in Oslo (June 12 – 16).

July
 4 – The Kongsberg Jazzfestival opened at Kongsberg consert (July 4 – 7).
 6 – The Baltic Jazz festival started in Dalsbruk (July 6 – 8).
 7
 The 40th Copenhagen Jazz Festival start in Copenhagen, Denmark (July 7 – 16).
 The 22nd Skånevik Bluesfestival started in Skånevik, Norway, with Jeff Beck as headliner (July 7 – 9).
 12 – The 17th Stavernfestivalen started in Stavern, Norway (July 12 – 14).
 13
 The 43rd North Sea Jazz Festival started in The Hague, Netherlands ( July 7–9).
 The 45th Umbria Jazz Festival start in Perugia, Italy (July 13 – 22).
 14
 The 30th Aarhus Jazz Festival started in Aarhus, Denmark (July 14 – 21).
 The 54th Pori Jazz Festival started in Pori, Finland (July 14 – 22).
 16 – The Moldejazz start in Molde (July 16 – 21).
 17
 The 71st Nice Jazz Festival started in Nice, France (July 17 – 21).
 The 42nd Jazz de Vitoria start in Gasteiz, Spain (July 17 – 21).
 25 – The 23rd Canal Street started in Arendal, Norway (July 25 – 28).
 27 – The 41st Jazz in Marciac started in Marciac, France (July 27 – August 15).

August 
 3
 The 62nd Newport Jazz Festival started in Newport, Rhode Island (August 3 – 5).
 The Nišville International Jazz Festival started in Niš, Serbia (August 3 – 13).
 8
 The 19th Øyafestivalen started in Oslo, Norway (August 8 – 11).
 The 32nd Sildajazz started in Haugesund, Norway (August 8 – 12).
 9 – The Tromsø Jazz Festival started in Tromsø (August 9 – 12).
10 – The 34th Brecon Jazz Festival started in Brecon, Wales (August 10 – 12).
 11 – The 33rd Oslo Jazzfestival started in Oslo, Norway (August 11 – 18).
 17 – The Parkenfestivalen started in Bodø (August 17–18).
 30 – The 14th Punktfestivalen opened in Kristiansand (August 30 - September 1|).

September 
 21 – The 61st Monterey Jazz Festival started in Monterey, California (September 21 – 23).

October 
 17 – The 54th Prague International Jazz Festival started in Prague (March 17 – October 6).
 18 – The 36th DølaJazz started in Lillehammer (October 18 – 21).
 22 – Vocalist Veronica Swift, the daughter of singer Stephanie Nakasian and the late pianist Hod O'Brien, was attacked on subway platform in New York City.
 25 – The 40th Guinness Cork Jazz Festival started in Cork City, Ireland (October 25 – 29).

November 
 1 – The 55th JazzFest Berlin, also known as the Berlin Jazz Festival started in Berlin (November 1 – 4).

December 
 The 24th Umbria Jazz Winter started in Orvieto, Italy (December 20 - January 1).

Albums released

January

February

March

April

May

June

July

August

September

October

November

Deaths

January 
 4 – Ray Thomas, British flautist and singer, The Moody Blues (born 1941).
 14
 Bill Hughes, American trombonist and bandleader (born 1930).
 Marlene VerPlanck, American singer (born 1933).
 20 – Terry Evans, American singer and guitarist (born 1937).
 22 – Billy Hancock, American singer, guitarist, bassist, and multiinstrumentalist (born 1946).
 23 – Hugh Masekela, South African trumpeter, singer, and composer (born 1939).
 25 – Tommy Banks, Canadian pianist (born 1936).
 28
 Eddie Shaw, American saxophonist (born 1937).
 Coco Schumann, German guitarist (born 1924).
 29 – Asmund Bjørken, Norwegian accordionist and saxophonist (born 1933).

February 
 3 – Leon "Ndugu" Chancler, American drummer (born 1952).
 5 – Ove Stokstad, Norwegian printmaker, clarinetist and saxophonist (born 1939).
 7 – John Perry Barlow, American lyricist, poet, and essayist (born 1925).
 8 – Algia Mae Hinton, American guitarist and singer (born 1929).
 9 – Wesla Whitfield, American singer (born 1947).
 11 – Vic Damone, American singer, songwriter, and actor (born 1928).
 18 – Didier Lockwood, French violinist, Magma (born 1956).
 22 – Errol Buddle, Australian bassoonist and saxophonist (born 1928).

March 
 4 – Russell Solomon, American entrepreneur, art collector, and founder of the Tower Records (born 1925).
 7 – Jerzy Milian, Polish vibraphonist (born 1935).
 12 – Olly Wilson, American composer, pianist, upright bassist, and musicologist (born 1937).
 16 – Buell Neidlinger, American upright bassist and cellist (born 1936).
 22 – Morgana King, American singer and actress (born 1930).
 29 Jimmy Woods, American alto saxophonist (born 1934).

April 

 1 – Audrey Morris, American singer and pianist (born 1928).
 3 – Lill-Babs or Barbro Svensson, Swedish singer and actress (born 1938).
 5 – Cecil Taylor, American pianist and poet (born 1929).
 8 – Nathan Davis, American saxophonist, flautist, and multi-instrumentalist (born 1937).
 11 – Jim Caine, British pianist and radio presenter (born 1926).
 12 – Gyula Babos, Hungarian guitarist (born 1949).
 14 – Brian Rolland, American guitarist, composer, and songwriter (born 1954).
 16 – Dona Ivone Lara, Brazilian samba singer (born 1921).
 17 – Peter Guidi, Scottish saxophonist and flutist (born 1949).
 23 – Bob Dorough, American pianist, composer, and vocalese singer (born 1923).
 26 – Charles Neville, American R&B saxophonist, The Neville Brothers (born 1938).
 27 – Gildo Mahones, American pianist (born 1929).
 28 – Brooks Kerr, American pianist (born 1951).

May 

 1 – John "Jabo" Starks, American drummer (born 1938).
 11 – Mikhail Alperin, Ukrainian born pianist, Moscow Art Trio (born 1956).
 17 – Jon Sholle, American guitarist and multi-instrumentalist (born 1948).
 18 – Jack Reilly, American pianist (born 1932).
 19 – Reggie Lucas, American guitarist and songwriter (born 1953).

June 
 4 – Norman Edge, American upright bassist (born 1934).
 5 – Brian Browne, Canadian pianist and composer (born 1937).
 9 – Lorraine Gordon, American jazz music advocate, Village Vanguard jazz club (born 1922).
 11 – Wayne Dockery, American bassist (born 1941).
 12 – Jon Hiseman, British drummer, recording engineer, and record producer, Colosseum, Colosseum II, John Mayall & the Bluesbreakers (born 1944).
 13 – D. J. Fontana, American drummer (born 1931).
 15 – Matt Murphy, American guitarist, The Blues Brothers (born 1929).
 17 – Rebecca Parris, American singer (born 1951).
 21 – Bob Bain, American guitarist (born 1924).
 26
 Big Bill Bissonnette, American trombonist, drummer and producer (born 1937).
 Fedor Frešo, Slovak bassist (born 1947).

July 
 2 
 Henry Butler, American pianist (born 1948).
 Bill Watrous, American trombonist (born 1939).
 8 – Tab Hunter, American actor, singer, and author (born 1931).
 15 – Theryl DeClouet, American singer, Galactic (born 1951).
 23 – Duke Carl Gregor of Mecklenburg, member of the House of Mecklenburg-Strelitz and a music and art historian (born 1933).
 25 – Patrick Williams, American composer, arranger, and conductor (born 1939).
 29 – Tomasz Stanko, Polish trumpeter and composer (born 1942).

August 

 10 – Ken Pickering, Canadian jazz promoter, Vancouver Jazz Festival co-founder (born 1952).
 16 – Aretha Franklin, American singer and songwriter (born 1942).
 18 – Jack Costanzo, American percussionist (born 1919).
 22 – Lazy Lester, American singer and guitarist (born 1933).

September 

 1 – Randy Weston, American pianist and composer (born 1926).
 12 – Erich Kleinschuster, Austrian trombonist and bandleader (born 1930).
 14 – Max Bennett, American bassist, L.A. Express, The Wrecking Crew (born 1928).
 16
 Maartin Allcock, British multi-instrumentalist, Fairport Convention, Jethro Tull (born 1957).
 Big Jay McNeely, American saxophonist (born 1927).
 29 – Otis Rush, American singer and guitarist (born 1935).

October 

 1 – Jerry González, American trumpeter (born 1949).
 3 – John Von Ohlen, American drummer, Blue Wisp Big Band (born 1941).
 4 – Hamiet Bluiett, American saxophonist, World Saxophone Quartet (born 1940).
 10 – Theresa Hightower, African-American singer (born 1954).
 17 – Chuck Wilson, American saxophonist (born 1948).
 25 – Sonny Fortune, American saxophonist (born 1939).
 27 – Fred Hess, American tenor saxophonist (born 1944).

November 

 2 – Roy Hargrove, American trumpeter (born 1969).
 15 – Ivan Smirnov, Russian guitarist (born 1955).
 25 – Shep Shepherd, American drummer and trombonist (born 1917).
 27 – Johnny Maddox, American pianist (born 1927).
 28
 Norio Maeda, Japanese composer and pianist (born 1934).
 Roger Neumann, American saxophonist, flutist, and composer (born 1941).

December 

 1 – Calvin Newborn, American guitarist (born 1933).
 2 – Perry Robinson, American clarinetist and composer (born 1938).
 7 – The Mascara Snake or Victor Hayden, American avant-garde clarinetist, Captain Beefheart and His Magic Band (born 1948).
 13 – Nancy Wilson, American singer (born 1937).
 15 – Arthur Maia, Brazilian jazz and samba bassist and composer (born 1962).
 30 – Miúcha, Brazilian singer and composer (born 1937).
 31 – Urbie Green, American trombonist (born 1926).

See also

 List of 2018 albums
 List of jazz festivals
 List of years in jazz
 2010s in jazz
 2018 in music

References

External links 
 History Of Jazz Timeline: 2018 at All About Jazz

2010s in jazz
Jazz